Sanam Jung is a Pakistani actress, model and former television host and VJ. She made her television debut with Hum TV's popular series Dil e Muztar in (2013).

Career 
Jung started her career as a VJ on Play TV in 2008, while studying for her BBA (Banking and Finance), but then moved to AAG TV in 2010 during her MBA (Finance). She made her acting debut in Dil e Muztar on Hum TV opposite Imran Abbas Naqvi, Sarwat Gilani, Aijaz Aslam, and Saba Hameed. In 2013, she appeared in Mohabat Subh Ka Sitara Hai opposite Meekal Zulfiqar and Adeel Hussain. She next appeared in Mere Humdum Mere Dost with Adnan Siddiqui and Hareem Farooq. She then appeared in Alvida again with Imran Abbas Naqvi in 2015 .

From 2014, till 30 November 2018, she was the host of Jago Pakistan Jago on Hum TV.

Sanam made her comeback with Mein Na Janoo in 2019 which was a joint venture between MD Productions and Cereal Production of Adnan Siddiqui. It is directed by Furqan Khan for Hum Tv and also stars Zahid Ahmed (actor) and Affan Waheed.
Sanam did a negative character for the first time in Qarar as Maya in 2020 with Mikaal Zulfiqar, Rabab Hashim, and Muneeb Butt on Hum TV.

Sanam Jung will now be appearing in Pyari Mona as the titular character, alongside Adeel Hussain for Hum TV. The drama is set to tackle body issues and conventional beauty standards set by society.

Sanam will also be starring in the upcoming Ary drama Ab Nahi Milenge Hum. Directed by Kashif Saleem, alongside Affan Waheed, Agha Ali and Komal Meer

Television

Telefilm

Show host

References 

Living people
Pakistani television actresses
Pakistani female models
Pakistani television hosts
Pakistani film actresses
Actresses from Karachi
21st-century Pakistani actresses
Pakistani women television presenters
1988 births